Charles Flint Rhem (January 24, 1901 – July 30, 1969), born in Rhems, South Carolina, was a pitcher for the St. Louis Cardinals (1924–28, 1930–32, 1934 and 1936), Philadelphia Phillies (1932–33) and Boston Braves (1934–35).

Before his professional career, Rhem played for the Clemson Tigers baseball team (1922–24).  He helped the Cardinals win the 1926, 1931, and 1934 World Series and 1928 and 1930 National League pennants.

He finished 8th in voting for the 1926 National League MVP for having a 20–7 win–loss record, 34 games, 34 games started, 20 complete games, 1 shutout, 258 innings pitched, 241 hits allowed, 121 runs allowed, 92 earned runs allowed, 12 home runs allowed, 75 walks allowed, 72 strikeouts, 1 hit batsmen, 5 wild pitches, 1,068 batters faced, 1 balk and a 3.21 ERA.

In 12 seasons he had a 105–97 win–loss record, 294 games, 229 games started, 91 complete games, 8 shutouts, 41 games finished, 10 saves,  innings pitched, 1,958 hits allowed, 989 runs allowed, 805 earned runs allowed, 113 home runs allowed, 529 walks allowed, 534 strikeouts, 20 hit batsmen, 33 wild pitches, 7,516 batters faced, 4 balks and a 4.20 ERA.

Rhem died in Columbia, South Carolina, at the age of 68.

See also
List of Major League Baseball annual wins leaders

References

External links

1901 births
1969 deaths
Major League Baseball pitchers
Baseball players from South Carolina
St. Louis Cardinals players
Philadelphia Phillies players
Boston Braves players
National League wins champions
People from Georgetown County, South Carolina
Clemson Tigers baseball players
Nashville Vols players